Mani stones are stone plates, rocks or pebbles inscribed with the six-syllabled mantra of Avalokiteshvara (Om mani padme hum, hence the name mani stone), as a form of prayer in Tibetan Buddhism. The term mani stone may also be used to refer to stones on which any mantra or devotional designs (such as ashtamangala) are inscribed or painted. Mani stones are intentionally placed along the roadsides and rivers or grouped together to form mounds or cairns or sometimes long walls, as an offering to spirits of place or genius loci. Creating and carving mani stones as devotional or intentional process art is a traditional sadhana of piety to yidam. Mani stones are a form of devotional cintamani.

The preferred technique is sunk relief, where an area around each letter is carved out, leaving the letters at the original surface level, now higher than the background. The stones are often painted in symbolic colours for each syllable (om white, ma green, ni yellow, pad light blue, me red, hum dark blue), which may be renewed when they are lost by weathering.

Mani walls
Along the paths of regions under the influence of Tibetan Buddhism, mani stones are often placed in long stacks along trails, forming mani walls. Buddhist custom dictates that these walls should be passed or circumvented from the left side, the clockwise direction in which the earth and the universe revolve, according to Buddhist doctrine.

They are sometimes close to a temple or chorten, sometimes completely isolated and range from a few metres to a kilometre long and one to two metres high. They are built of rubble and sand and faced with mani stones engraved in the elegant Tibetan script.

Nepal

The same type of mani stones can be seen in neighbouring Nepal, where Buddhism is also widely practised. Large examples of mani stones resembling tablets carved out of the sides of rock formations are in locations throughout the Nepali areas of the Himalayas, such as Namche Bazar. Mani stone walls are most numerous in the high country of the Khumbu. The mantra of Avalokiteshvara is also a common design on prayer wheels and prayer flags in Nepal.

Gallery

See also 
 Gsumge Mani Stone Castle
 Śarīra
 Stele of Sulaiman, 1348 stele with Om mani padme hum inscribed in six scripts
 Yongning Temple Stele, 1413 stele with Om mani padme hum inscribed in four scripts

References

External links

 World's largest Mani stone mound in Qinghai, China. Estimated over 2 billion stones
 Longest Mani stone wall in the world

Tibetan Buddhist ritual implements
Tibetan Buddhist art and culture
Buddhist religious objects
Sacred rocks
Stone monuments and memorials